USW may refer to:

Ultra-shortwave, see: Very high frequency
United Steelworkers, North American labor union
University of South Wales, a British University
Unrestricted submarine warfare
Union of Soviet Writers
 German abbreviation for "und so weiter", meaning et cetera